Mitsamiouli (population 6,100) is a town on the northwest coast of Grande Comore in the Comoros.

History
Of the 175 passengers, 125 died, despite rescue attempts by island residents and tourists.

Geography
Mitsamiouli lies on the northwest coast of the island, along the main coast road RN-1 and RN-3. This coastal road connects it to Djomani and Ntsaouéni further to the south on the west coast and Ivoini on the northeast coast. The RR 122 road runs south from Mitsamiouli and leads to the village of Bangoi Mafsankoa further inland, which has its own mosque.
Lac Sale Crater – Lac Sale is an ancient volcano crater, near Mitsamihuli, filled with sea water.

Economy
Tourism is important in the area, particularly from European honeymooners. Fishing is also practiced in Mitsamihuli.

Notable people
Djoueria Abdallah, the first female member of the Assembly of the Union of the Comoros

References

Populated places in Grande Comore